After Midnight is an album by the progressive bluegrass Maryland band The Seldom Scene.

Track listing 
 "Lay Down Sally" (Eric Clapton, Marcy Levy, George Terry) 4:08
 "Hearts Overflowing" (Michael Brewer) 3:56
 "The Old Home Town" (Lester Flatt) 2:39
 "Stompin' at the Savoy" (Benny Goodman, Andy Razaf, Edgar Sampson, Chick Webb) 3:28
 "The Border Incident" (John Duffey) 4:25
 "Come Early Morning" (McDill) 2:56
 "After Midnight" (JJ Cale) 4.51
 "If I Had Left It Up To You" (Merle Haggard) 3:24
 "Heartsville Pike" (Jim McReynolds, Jesse McReynolds) 3:26
 "Stolen Love" (Phil Rosenthal) 3:51
 "Let Old Mother Nature Have Her Way" (Louie Clark, Loys Southerland) 3:07

Personnel 
The Seldom Scene
 Phil Rosenthal – vocals, guitar
 John Duffey – mandolin, vocals
 Ben Eldridge – banjo, guitar, vocals
 Mike Auldridge – Dobro, guitar, vocals
 Tom Gray – bass, vocals
with
 Carl Nelson – violin

References

External links 
 Official site
 YouTube clips
 After Midnight
 Lay Down Sally
 The Old Home Town

1981 albums
The Seldom Scene albums
Sugar Hill Records albums